The 2021 World Wrestling Championships was the 17th edition of the World Wrestling Championships of combined events and was held from 2 to 10 October 2021 in Oslo, Norway.

The event was subsequent to the 2019 World Championships due to the cancelation of the 2020 edition during the COVID-19 pandemic. The 2020 Individual World Cup was held as replacement for the World Wrestling Championships.

Medal table

Team ranking

Medal summary

Men's freestyle

Men's Greco-Roman

Women's freestyle

Participating nations
648 competitors from 66 nations participated.

 (1)
 (1)
 (12)
 (1)
 (4)
 (22)
 (3)
 (22)
 (1)
 (6)
 (20)
 (15)
 (2)
 (2)
 (2)
 (4)
 (4)
 (3)
 (2)
 (3)
 (7)
 (5)
 (9)
 (20)
 (22)
 (3)
 (3)
 (13)
 (30)
 (20)
 (3)
 (6)
 (30)
 (27)
 (9)
 (15)
 (3)
 (12)
 (9)
 (15)
 (20)
 (1)
 (2)
 (2)
 (2)
 (12)
 (1)
 (23)
 (2)
 (1)
 (8)
 (30)
 (1)
 (9)
 (6)
 (27)
 (2)
 (5)
 (8)
 (1)
 (1)
 (30)
 (30)
 (30)
 (1)
 (2)

 Under the Court of Arbitration for Sport ban, Russia may not use its name, flag, or anthem and must present themselves as "Neutral Athlete" or "Neutral Team" at any world championships until December 16, 2022. Thus, Russian wrestlers competed under a modified flag and the name "Russian Wrestling Federation" (RWF) at the 2021 World Championships.

References

External links

 Results Book
 Official website

 
World Wrestling Championships
World Championships
Wrestling Championships
International wrestling competitions hosted by Norway
Sport in Oslo
Wrestling in Norway
World Wrestling Championships